The 2022 United States House of Representatives elections in South Carolina were held on November 8, 2022, to elect the seven U.S. representatives from the state of South Carolina, one from each of the state's seven congressional districts. The elections coincided with other elections to the House of Representatives, elections to the United States Senate and various state and local elections.

Overview

District 1

The 1st district straddles the Atlantic coast of the state, and includes most of Charleston. The incumbent is Republican Nancy Mace, who flipped the district and was elected with 50.6% of the vote in 2020.

Republican primary

Candidates

Nominee
Nancy Mace, incumbent U.S. Representative

Eliminated in primary
Katie Arrington, former state representative and nominee for this district in 2018

Withdrew
T.J. Allen, U.S. Army veteran
Keith Blandford, U.S. Navy veteran, Libertarian nominee for this district in 2012, and Republican candidate for this district in the 2013 special election (running for Secretary of State)
Ingrid Centurion, retired lieutenant colonel and Iraq War veteran (endorsed Arrington)
Lynz Piper-Loomis, speaker (endorsed Arrington)

Declined
Eric Bolling, conservative commentator

Endorsements

Debates and forums

Polling

Results

Democratic primary

Candidates

Nominee
Annie Andrews, pediatrician

Withdrawn
Tim Lewis, Dorchester County Democratic Party chairman

Endorsements

Independents and other parties

Candidates

Declared
Lucas Devan Faulk (Labor)

General election 
Before the general election, on October 19, 2022, Mace and Andrews participated in their sole debate, organized by WCBD-TV in Charleston, SC.

Predictions

Results

District 2

The 2nd district is located in central South Carolina and spans from Columbia to the South Carolina side of the Augusta, Georgia metropolitan area, including North Augusta. The incumbent is Republican Joe Wilson, who was re-elected with 55.7% of the vote in 2020.

Republican primary

Candidates

Nominee
Joe Wilson, incumbent U.S. Representative

Endorsements

Democratic primary

Candidates

Nominee
Judd Larkins, grocery store owner

Withdrew
Gregory Karr, progressive activist

General election

Predictions

Results

District 3

The 3rd district takes in the Piedmont area in northwestern South Carolina, including Anderson and Greenwood. The incumbent is Republican Jeff Duncan, who was re-elected with 71.2% of the vote in 2020. Duncan was not opposed in the general election, as the state Democrats did not put up a candidate.

Republican primary

Candidates

Nominee
Jeff Duncan, incumbent U.S. Representative

Endorsements

General election

Predictions

Results

District 4

The 4th district is located in Upstate South Carolina, taking in Greenville and Spartanburg. The incumbent is Republican William Timmons, who was re-elected with 61.6% of the vote in 2020. Democratic nominee Ken Hill withdrew his candidacy in August. Lee Turner organized a write-in campaign for the seat, after court ruling that State Democrats could not place another candidate on the ballot.

Republican primary

Candidates

Nominee
William Timmons, incumbent U.S. Representative

Eliminated in primary
George Abuzeid, commercial pilot
Mark Burns, televangelist and candidate for this district in 2018
Michael LaPierre, entrepreneur

Polling

Results

Democratic primary

Candidates

Nominee (withdrew) 
 Ken Hill, business consultant

Independents and other parties

Candidates

Declared 
 Michael Chandler (Constitution), perennial candidate

General election

Predictions

Results

District 5

The 5th district is located in northern South Carolina and encompasses the southern suburbs and exurbs of Charlotte, including Rock Hill. The incumbent is Republican Ralph Norman, who was re-elected with 60.1% of the vote in 2020.

Republican primary

Candidates

Nominee
Ralph Norman, incumbent U.S. Representative

Democratic primary

Candidates

Nominee
Evangeline Hundley, realtor

Eliminated in primary
Kevin Eckert, Wildlife Services biological science technician

Results

Independents and other parties

Candidates

Declared
Larry Gaither (Green), American candidate for this seat in 2016

General election

Predictions

Results

District 6

The 6th district runs through the Black Belt and takes in Columbia and North Charleston. The incumbent is Democrat Jim Clyburn, who was re-elected with 68.2% of the vote in 2020.

Democratic primary

Candidates

Nominee
Jim Clyburn, incumbent U.S. Representative and House Majority Whip

Eliminated in primary
Michael Addison, candidate for state representative in 2020
Gregg Marcel Dixon, Gullah educator, reparations activist

Endorsements

Results

Republican primary

Candidates

Nominee
Duke Buckner, attorney and former member of Walterboro City Council

Eliminated in primary
Sonia Morris, business professor

Results

General election

Predictions

Results

District 7

The 7th district is located in northeastern South Carolina, taking in Myrtle Beach and Florence. The incumbent is Republican Tom Rice, who was re-elected with 61.8% of the vote in 2020. During the district's Republican primary, Rice was defeated by state representative Russell Fry, who went on to win the general election with 64.9% of the vote.

Republican primary

Candidates

Nominee
Russell Fry, state representative

Eliminated in primary
Barbara Arthur, businesswoman and activist
Garrett Barton, physician
Mark McBride, former mayor of Myrtle Beach
Spencer Morris, pharmacist
Tom Rice, incumbent U.S. Representative
Ken Richardson, chairman of the Horry County School Board

Withdrew
Graham Allen, U.S. Army veteran and political commentator
Jeanette Spurlock

Endorsements

Polling

Runoff polling

Results

Democratic primary

Candidates

Nominee
Daryl W. Scott, National Guard officer

General election

Predictions

Results

Notes

Partisan clients

References

External links
 South Carolina Election Commission
 This Week in South Carolina | Midterm Election Recap
Official campaign websites for 1st district candidates
Nancy Mace and Annie Andrews debate
 Annie Andrews (D) for Congress
 Nancy Mace (R) for Congress
Official campaign websites for 2nd district candidates
Judd Larkins and Joe Wilson debate
 Juddson Larkins (D) for Congress
 Joe Wilson (R) for Congress
Official campaign websites for 3rd district candidates
 Jeff Duncan (R) for Congress
Official campaign websites for 4th district candidates
 Ken Hill (D) for Congress
 William Timmons (R) for Congress
Official campaign websites for 5th district candidates
 Evangeline Hundley (D) for Congress
 Ralph Norman (R) for Congress
Official campaign websites for 6th district candidates
 Duke Buckner (R) for Congress
 Jim Clyburn (D) for Congress

Official campaign websites for 7th district candidates
Daryl Scott (D) for Congress
 Russell Fry (R) for Congress
 Larry Guy Hammond (L) for Congress

2022
South Carolina
United States House of Representatives